HM Prison Norwich is a Category B/C multi-functional prison for adult and juvenile males, located on Mousehold Heath in Norwich, Norfolk, England. The prison is operated by His Majesty's Prison Service.

History
Norwich opened as a prison in 1887, on the site of the Britannia Barracks (the former home of the Royal Norfolk Regiment). The prison has had a variety of roles over the years, but today acts as a prison for Category B & C inmates. The impressive barrack block which stood behind the facade served as a Category C prison for some years from the 1970s but was demolished in the 1980s and replaced by a modern Category B prison block. The Victorian prison which stands at the end of Knox Road behind the old Barracks site was built in the mid-19th century as part of the reformation of the penal system brought about by the great prison reformers of that time. These included Elizabeth Fry.

In January 2003 a report from Her Majesty's Chief Inspector of Prisons severely criticised Norwich Prison for factors including poor cleanliness and the failure of its anti-drug and anti-bullying programmes. The report also criticised the lack of work and education opportunities at the jail for inmates.

In November 2004 the Prison Reform Trust criticised levels of overcrowding at Norwich Prison. The trust stated that nearly half of all single cells at the jail here holding two prisoners, and inmates were spending too much time locked up in their cells.

At around this time Norwich became the only prison in England and Wales to have a unit exclusively for elderly male prisoners (mainly serving life sentences). This has meant that a number of high-profile elderly prisoners have been held at HMP Norwich in recent years.

The prison today
The site is divided into various wings and units which house different facilities and categories of prisoners:

 Wing A1 - Induction Wing
 Wing A2 - Induction Wing
 Wing A3 - Induction Wing
 Wing A4 - Induction Wing
 Wing A5 - Induction Wing
 Wing A6 - Induction Wing
 Wing B1 - Category B & C prisoners
 Wing B2 - Category B & C prisoners 
 Wing B3 - Category B & C prisoners 
 Wing C1 - Sex offenders & vulnerable prisoners
 Wing C2 - Sex offenders & vulnerable prisoners
 Wing C3 - Sex offenders & vulnerable prisoners
 Wing D - Britannia House (Category D prisoners)
 Wing E - Older prisoner Wing (Category B & C)
 Wing F - Local discharge unit (Category C)
 Wing G - Local discharge unit (Category C)
 Wing H - Healthcare Centre
 Wing L - Elderly prisoners (mainly serving life sentences) 
 Wing M - Category C prisoners with 24 months or less to serve
 
Education provision for inmates at Norwich Prison is mainly centred on basic and key skills. Other courses offered include ESOL, Food Hygiene, First Aid, Health and Safety, NVQ Catering, Art and Craft and pre-release work programmes. A number of workshop places are available across the prison for inmates including Printing, Textiles, Contract packing Services and Gardens. Other facilities at the prison include a gym and a multi-faith chaplaincy.

There is also a Prison Visitor Centre which is operated by the Ormiston Children and Families Trust.

On 4 May 2016, ITV broadcast Her Majesty's Prison: Norwich. The documentary records the daily life of the inmates and their families.

Notable former inmates
 Reggie Kray
 Anthony Sawoniuk
 Ronnie Biggs
 Donald Neilson

References

External links
 Ministry of Justice pages on HMP Norwich

Norwich
Norwich
Norwich
Norwich
Buildings and structures in Norwich
1887 establishments in England